The Grand Mosalla Mosque of Tehran, also known as the Imam Khomeini Mosalla, is a mosque in Tehran, Iran. It is used for hosting weekly Friday prayer, as well as cultural, political, educational, worship activities, including book fairs, exhibitions, and religious ceremonies.

History
The Grand Mosalla Mosque originated in a 1982 proposal to replace the University of Tehran as the primary location for weekly Friday prayer. A large section of land in Abbas Abad, the original site for the never-materialized pre-Revolution megaproject Shahestan Pahlavi, was allocated for the Grand Mosalla.

On 19 February 1985, a public announcement was issued, calling on talented and experienced designers to submit drafts for the mosque's design. The competition was held in 1986 with Mohammad Karim Pirnia, Mehdi Chamran, Bagher Ayatollahzadeh Shirazi, Ali Ghaffari, and Mehdi Hodjat as the jury members, and with the participation of 36 native and foreign individuals from such countries as Japan, Syria, Pakistan, and the Netherlands, as well as legal entities. On 1990, Dr. Parviz Moayed Ahd’s design was confirmed for the Mosalla. The design was based on the Islamic architecture of Iran, Tajikistan, Azerbaijan, and Georgia, which were historically part of the Achaemenid Empire.

As of 2017, almost three decades since the design was finalized, the Grand Mosalla was still under construction, though finished sections of the building were in use. The Financial Tribune called the condition of the project "dismal" and "unacceptable", and Governor General of Tehran Province Hussein Hashemi urged Tehran City Council to prioritize the mosque's completion.

Use 
The Grand Mosalla Mosque is used for Friday prayer and Eid al-Fitr prayers. It is also used as a community center and a venue for local and national events, including the Tehran International Book Fair, International Holy Quran Exhibition, International Exhibition of Investment Opportunities in Iran's Mines and Mining Industries, International Handicrafts Exhibition, and the Tehran Game Exhibition, among other events.

Access
The Grand Mosalla Mosque is served by the Mosalla Imam Khomeini Metro Station, a Tehran Metro station located in the Grand Mosalla, next to the Qasem Soleimani Expressway. It also has a bus rapid transit station in Line 5: Science & Tech Terminal to Argentina Square Beihaghi Terminal.

Gallery

See also
Jamaran Hussainiya

References

External links

Buildings and structures in Tehran
Official residences in Iran
Supreme Leaders of Iran
1989 establishments in Iran
Religious leadership roles
Politics of Iran
Iranian entities subject to the U.S. Department of the Treasury sanctions